Saint-Martin-de-Crau (Provençal: Sant Martin de Crau) is a commune in the Bouches-du-Rhône department in southern France. Inhabitants are called Saint-Martinois.

Population
Saint-Martin-de-Crau has the lowest population density of all communes in metropolitan France that have a population exceeding 12,000 inhabitants (2012). With a land area of 214.87 km2 (82.962 sq mi), it is the fifth-largest commune in geographic area in metropolitan France (after Arles, Saintes-Maries-de-la-Mer, Laruns, and Marseille).

Twin towns
Saint-Martin-de-Crau is twinned with:
 , Markgröningen, Germany

See also
 Alpilles
 Communes of the Bouches-du-Rhône department

References

External links
 Official Web site

Communes of Bouches-du-Rhône
Bouches-du-Rhône communes articles needing translation from French Wikipedia